Shubael Pond is a  kettle pond in Barnstable, Massachusetts.

There is a concrete launching ramp for canoes or shallow draft boats and a small parking area which can be accessed via Willimantic Road.

Shubael Pond is stocked twice a year with several varieties of trout.

References

MassWildlife map and info

Barnstable, Massachusetts
Ponds of Barnstable County, Massachusetts
Ponds of Massachusetts